Luxeuil-les-Bains is a commune in the Haute-Saône department in the region of Bourgogne-Franche-Comté in eastern France.

History

Luxeuil (sometimes rendered Luxeu in older texts) was the Roman Luxovium and contained many fine buildings at the time of its destruction by the Huns under Attila in 451. In 590, St Columban here founded the Abbey of Luxeuil, afterwards one of the most famous in Franche-Comté. In the 8th century, it was destroyed by the Saracens; afterwards rebuilt, monastery and town were devastated by the Normans, Magyars, and Muslims in the 9th century and pillaged on several occasions afterwards.  The burning of the monastery and ravaging of the town are commonly used to illustrate the point that no place in Europe was safe during the invasions.

The abbey schools were celebrated in the Middle Ages and the abbots had great influence; but their power was curtailed by the emperor Charles V and the abbey was suppressed at the time of the French Revolution.

Climate

Population

Town twinning 
Luxeuil-les-Bains is twinned with:

  Wallingford, England and Bad Wurzach, Germany

Notable people 
 Allann Petitjean, footballer

See also
Communes of the Haute-Saône department

References
 H Beaumont, Etude hist. sur l'abbaye de Luxeuil, 890-1790 (Lux. 1895)
 Grandmongin and A Garnier, Hist. de la mile et des thermes de Luxeuil (Paris, 1866), with 16 plates.

External links

 New tourist office website (in French)
 Tourist office website (in French)

Communes of Haute-Saône
Spa towns in France
Sequani